The following is the discography of Gregg Allman, an American singer-songwriter and musician, also including releases from the Gregg Allman Band. Allman released his debut studio album, Laid Back, in 1973; it charted at number 13 on Billboard Top Pop Albums chart and went gold. His subsequent solo releases, including the live album The Gregg Allman Tour (1974), Playin' Up a Storm (1977), and the collaboration Two the Hard Way (1977) with Cher, did not fare well on charts or in sales. In 1987, he was signed to Epic Records, and his third solo album, I'm No Angel, went gold on the strength of its title track. His next two solo albums, Just Before the Bullets Fly (1988) and Searching for Simplicity (1997), did not perform well. His final studio album released during his lifetime, Low Country Blues (2011), represented his biggest chart positions, including at number five in the US. A posthumous studio album, Southern Blood, was released on September 8, 2017.

In 2009, Raven Records in Australia released the compilation "One More Silver Dollar: The Solo Years 1973-1997", sampling his first six solo records, plus a duet with Bonnie Bramlett, "Two Steps From the Blues" from her 1976 solo album, "Lady's Choice". 

On 28 October 2021, Sony Music Publishing announced it had signed a global agreement with Gregg Allman's estate to administer its catalog of songs. The deal covers many of Allman's compositions from his time as a member of the Allman Brothers Band, as well as songs written throughout his solo career.

Albums

Studio albums

Live albums

Collaboration albums

Tribute albums

Compilation albums

Extended plays

Singles

Other appearances

Videos

Music videos

Video albums

See also
 The Allman Brothers Band discography

Notes

References

External links
 Official website
 

Discographies of American artists
Blues discographies
Rock music discographies